The men's sprint competition at the Biathlon World Championships 2007 was held on 3 February 2007.

Info
Ole Einar Bjørndalen took his thirteenth World Championships gold medal (including the five Olympic golds), though missing the very final shot threatened to lose him his title. However, most of the other early starters also missed shots, and after the first group of 24 top-placed skiers had finished, no one were within half a minute of Bjørndalen. Of the remaining skiers, only Michal Šlesingr and Maxim Tchoudov had placings among the top 30 in the overall World Cup ranking; Šlesingr completed a faultless shooting but was still six seconds behind from the range, and despite a fine finish he could not catch Bjørndalen, while Tchoudov's medal chances went as he missed twice in the standing shoot, also spending too much time at the range. However, Andriy Deryzemlya of Ukraine, who had not placed on a World Cup podium for two seasons, was ranked 34th in the overall World Cup, and who had not placed in the top six of sprint races for the last four seasons, used two perfect shootings to beat World Cup number three Björn Ferry by ten seconds. 

Neither Russia nor Germany managed to get anyone in the top ten; the best German was Alexander Wolf in 15th with three misses, with Birnbacher, World Cup leader Greis, and Michael Rösch also missing more than two times. Nikolay Kruglov, Jr., the winner of the Oberhof sprint race, placed 12th after slow skiing, but was still the best Russian, one place ahead of Tchoudov.

Results
The race was started at 10:45.

References

Men's Sprint